Ashram Chowk is a crossways located on the southeastern corner of the Delhi Ring Road . It is at the intersection of the Ring Road and Mathura Road from the ITO crossing, the Supreme Court, Pragati Maidan, Purana Quila, Nizamuddin Dargah and the Haryana border at Faridabad.

Ashram Chowk flyover
The Ashram Chowk Flyover Project, conducted by Consulting Engineering Services, was completed in 2001, and opened to traffic on 30 October of the same year. It passes over Ashram Chowk and helps to ease congestion towards the DND Flyway.

See also
 Ring Road, Delhi
 Pragati Maidan
 Mathura Road, Delhi
 Purana Qila, Delhi
 DND Flyway
 Neighborhoods of Delhi

References

Transport in Delhi
Roads in Delhi
Neighbourhoods in Delhi
Road junctions in India